also called Aquarium Asamushi, is an aquarium in the Asamushi area of Aomori, Aomori Prefecture, Japan. Overlooking Mutsu Bay, it is the northernmost aquarium in Honshū. It is also the largest general aquarium in the Tōhoku region. It keeps and displays 11,000 marine organisms, including those from Aomori Prefecture's abundant marine resources and over 500 species of rare aquatic animals from around the world.

History
The Asamushi Aquarium was founded in 1922 by the Biology Department of the School of Sciences of Tōhoku Imperial University. The aquarium is currently operated by the Aomori prefectural government.

Exhibits

The warm and cold water exhibits at the aquarium (a total of 45 tanks containing  of water) feature marine animals such as sea otters, sea lions, seals, penguins, and dolphins. The dolphin show tank is the largest in the facility and holds . The seawater tank on the first floor includes a  acrylic tunnel for viewing the inhabitants from underneath.

First floor
 Amphibian display
 Seawater tank (tunnel tank)
 Warm water creatures (tropical tank)
 Marine life
 Cold water creatures
 Rare fresh water creatures
 Delfino gift shop

Second Floor
 Tropical rainforest display
 Environmental "touch tank"
 Dolphin show pool
 Dolphins

Notes

External links

 

Aquaria in Japan
Tourist attractions in Aomori Prefecture
Buildings and structures in Aomori Prefecture
Aomori (city)